Andrew Blackman (born 2 August 1965) is an Australian born actor, producer, and director who founded the Complete Works Theatre Company (CWTC) in Melbourne in 1999.

Biography
Blackman was born in Brisbane, Queensland, and began acting at the age of seven in the play 'Dark of the Moon' staged by the Queensland Theatre Company. He is known for his professional roles as Dr. Harry Morrison in A Country Practice and Don Fry in Mortified. Appearances of the seasoned actor were also made in the Logie Award winning show Utopia on ABC and the Stan original series Bloom.

Education 

 Dakabin State High School: Blackman's first public performance was in a high school musical production called "Teen".
 Kelvin Grove College of Advance Education:  Achieving an Associate Diploma in Performing Arts , Blackman was granted the Elizabeth Bequest Scholarship with TN! Theatre Co., leading to him performing two seasons of Shakespeare with the Grin & Tonic Theatre Troupe.
 National Institute of Dramatic Art (NIDA) in 1990.

Television and Movies

 A County Practice (1981 - 1994)
 Barracuda (2016)
 Bloom (2020)
 Blue Heelers (1994 - 2006)
 City Homicide (2007)
 Frenchman’s Farm (1987) 
 House Husbands (2014)
 Neighbours (1985–Present)
 Mortified (2006)
 Miss Fisher’s Murder Mysteries: S1: E10 “Death by Misadventure.” (2012)
 Satisfaction (2007 - 2010)
 Stingers (1998 - 2004)
 The Treadmill (2001)
 Underbelly (2013)
 Utopia (2014 - 2019)
 Walking with Dinosaurs: The Arena Spectacular (2015) 
 Wentworth (2013)
 Winners & Losers (2012)

Stage Work 

 A Man for All Seasons
 A Midsummer Night's Dream
 Cosi and The Crucible
 Extinction
 Hamlet
 Macbeth
 Medea (2015)
 Much Ado About Nothing
 Phat Poetry and Monkey Fights the Water Dragon
 Richard III
 Romeo and Juliet
 The Women of Troy

References

External links
 

Australian male television actors
1965 births
Living people
Male actors from Brisbane
National Institute of Dramatic Art alumni
Australian theatre directors